Beinn an Òir (Gaelic for "mountain of gold") is the highest peak of the Paps of Jura on the island of Jura, Scotland. It is the highest peak on the island, standing at 785 metres, and is thereby a Corbett.

Beinn an Òir is frequently climbed along with the other two peaks forming the Paps: Beinn Shiantaidh and Beinn a' Chaolais. The most usual route for this ascent starts from the bridge over the Corran River, and Beinn an Òir is invariably the second peak to be climbed, regardless of which order of peaks is chosen for the route.  Alternatively, it is possible to avoid the other two peaks and climb Beinn an Òir from either of the bealachs that separate it from its neighbours.

External links
 Computer-generated virtual panoramas Beinn an Oir Index

Marilyns of Scotland
Mountains and hills of the Scottish islands
Corbetts
Mountains and hills of Argyll and Bute
Paps of Jura